Richard Wright Procter (1816–1881) was an English barber, poet and author.

Life
The son of Thomas Procter, he was born of poor parents in Paradise Vale, Salford, Lancashire, on 19 December 1816. Apprenticed to a barber, in due course he set up in business for himself in Long Millgate, Manchester, where he also ran a circulating library. He remained there for the rest of his life.

Procter died at 133 Long-Millgate, Manchester, on 11 September 1881, and was buried at St. Luke's, Cheetham Hill. He had married, in 1840, Eliza Waddington, who predeceased him, and left five sons.

Works
When young Procter bought books, and sent poetical contributions to the local press.  In 1842 he associated with Samuel Bamford, John Critchley Prince, John Bolton Rogerson, and other local poets in meetings held at an inn, afterwards known as the "Poet's Corner", and he contributed to a volume of verse Festive Wreath which resulted. He had some pieces in City Muse (1853), edited by William Reid of Manchester. He published also:

Gems of Thought and Flowers of Fancy, 1855; a volume of poetical selections, of which the first and last pieces are by himself.
The Barber's Shop, with illustrations by William Morton, 1856; sketches of the odd characters he met. A second edition incorporated lore relating to hairdressing and to notable barbers, published, with a memoir by William Edward Armytage Axon, 1883.
Literary Reminiscences and Gleaning with Illustrations, 1860; mainly on Lancashire poets.
Our Turf, our Stage, and our Ring, 1862; historical sketches of racing and sporting life in Manchester.
Manchester in Holiday Dress, 1866; on theatres and other amusements in Manchester before 1810.
Memorials of Manchester Streets, 1874.
Memorials of Bygone Manchester, with Glimpses of the Environs, 1880.

Notes

Attribution

1816 births
1881 deaths
People from Salford
Burials in Greater Manchester
English male poets
19th-century English poets
19th-century English male writers